The equal-time rule specifies that American radio and television broadcast stations must provide equivalent access to competing political candidates. This means, for example, that if a station broadcasts a message by a candidate in prime time, it must offer the same amount of time on the same terms to an opposing candidate.

Details 
This rule originated in §18 of the Radio Act of 1927 which established the Federal Radio Commission; it was later superseded by the Communications Act of 1934, with the FRC becoming the FCC, the Federal Communications Commission. A related provision, in §315(b), requires that broadcasters offer time to candidates at the same rate as their "most favored advertiser".

The equal-time rule was created due to concerns that broadcast stations could easily manipulate the outcome of elections by presenting just one point of view and excluding other candidates.

There are several exceptions to the equal-time rule; 

If the airing was within a documentary, bona fide news interview, scheduled newscast, or an on-the-spot news event, the equal-time rule does not apply. 
Since 1983, political debates not hosted directly by a station or network are considered "news events," and as a result, they are not subject to the rule. Usually, these debates are coordinated through a third party such as the Commission on Presidential Debates, a state broadcaster's association, a newspaper independent of a television station/network, or the League of Women Voters. Consequently, these debates usually include only major-party candidates without having to offer airtime to minor-party or independent candidates, or inflammatory candidates who intend only to disrupt the proceedings. 
Talk shows and other regular news programming from syndicators, such as Entertainment Tonight, are also declared exempt from the rule by the FCC on a case-by-case basis.

The equal-time rule also can prove to disrupt regular entertainment programming. In the past, Ronald Reagan, Arnold Schwarzenegger, and Donald Trump had their past programs and films removed from broadcast as they campaigned for political office. Dr. Mehmet Oz declared his (ultimately unsuccessful) candidacy on November 30, 2021 for the Republican U.S. Senate seat in Pennsylvania, thus forcing television stations in Pennsylvania and surrounding states to drop his daily syndicated talk show from their schedule as part of the equal-time rule, and forcing Sony Pictures Television to line up alternate programming. Continued carriage of an entertainer's programming would have placed those stations in the position of offering the same hour of time to the other competitors in a political race daily, no matter the party. SPT and Oz since decided to discontinue the show entirely, replacing it with The Good Dish, a lifestyle and food show hosted by his daughter Daphne, where he never appeared on an episode.

The equal-time rule was suspended by Congress in 1960 to permit the Kennedy-Nixon debates to take place.

Fairness doctrines 
The equal-time rule should not be confused with the now-defunct FCC fairness doctrine, which dealt with presenting balanced points of view on matters of public importance.

The Zapple doctrine (part of a specific provision of the fairness doctrine) was similar to the equal-time rule but applied to different political campaign participants. The equal-time rule applies to the political candidate only. The Zapple doctrine had the same purpose and requirements of equivalent coverage opportunity as the equal-time rule, but its scope included the candidate's spokesman and supporters, not the candidate.

References

Footnotes

Bibliography
Communications Act of 1934, § 315; codified at 47 U.S.C. § 315
Radio Act of 1927

External links
Equal Time Rule in The Museum of Broadcast Communications
Radio and TV Stations Required to Give Equal Time in Issues of Democracy
MSN Encarta – Equal Time Rule (Archived  2009-10-31)

Political mass media in the United States
United States communications regulation
Broadcast law
Federal Communications Commission
1927 establishments in the United States